The D14 expressway is a state road in Croatia. The total completed length is 17.41 km and the planned length is 39.6 km.

The state road D14 will be part of the Zagreb Northern Bypass. The road is planned in the full profile of the expressway, but is currently being built in a semi-profile state.

Exit list 

{| class="wikitable"
|- 
!scope="col"|County
!scope="col"|Name
!scope="col"|Destination
!scope="col"|Note
|-
| rowspan=7| Krapina-Zagorje County
| Zabok
| 
| Link with the A2 motorway, Zabok in the north and Oroslavje in the south 
|-
| Andraševec
| Ž2197
| Link with Oroslavje and Stubičke Toplice in the south and Zabok in the north 
|-
| Bedekovčina
| Ž2198
| Link with Bedekovčina in the north and Donja Stubica in the south 
|-
| Poznanovec
| Ž2201
| Link with Donja Stubica and Marija Bistrica via D307 in the south
|-
| Zlatar Bistrica
| 
| Connection with Zlatar Bistrica and towards Marija Bistrica via D29 
|-
| bgcolor=#ffdddd | Marija Bistrica
| bgcolor=#ffdddd | 
| bgcolor=#ffdddd | Connection with Marija Bistrica and towards Donja Stubica via D307 
|-
| bgcolor=#ffdddd | Laz Stubički
| bgcolor=#ffdddd |
| bgcolor=#ffdddd |
|-
| rowspan=4|Zagreb
| bgcolor=#ffdddd |Kašina
| bgcolor=#ffdddd |
| bgcolor=#ffdddd |Link to Kašina
|-
| bgcolor=#ffdddd |Paruževina
| bgcolor=#ffdddd |
| bgcolor=#ffdddd |Link to Paruzevina 
|-
| bgcolor=#ffdddd |Soblinec
| bgcolor=#ffdddd | /
| bgcolor=#ffdddd |Link with the Zagreb bypass (A4) and D3

Sources 

D014
D014
D014